Tihon is a surname. Notable people with the surname include:

Alizee Tihon (born 1987/1988), competitor in Miss Belgium 2019
Anne Tihon (born 1944), Belgian historian
Camille Tihon (1890–1972), Belgian archivist and historian

See also
Timon